The following sweet pea (Lathyrus odoratus) cultivars have gained the Royal Horticultural Society's Award of Garden Merit. They are annuals grown as twining climbers, with flowers in pastel shades from white through pink to blue and deep purple. There are several bi-colours. Several cultivars are scented to a greater or lesser degree. Sweet peas can be badly affected by aphids, slugs and snails.

References

Sweet peas
Sweet peas